Anthony Hegarty (born 11 May 1987 in Canberra, Australia) is an Australian rugby union player who plays for FC Grenoble in the Top 14. He began his professional career for the Brumbies in Super Rugby. His playing position is hooker. He made his Super Rugby debut during the 2011 Super Rugby season against the Highlanders in Invercargill.

References

External links
Inr.fr profile
itsrugby.co.uk profile

Brumbies profile

1987 births
Living people
Australian rugby union players
Rugby union hookers
ACT Brumbies players
FC Grenoble players
Expatriate rugby union players in France
Rugby union players from Canberra